Kavali railway station (station code: KVZ), located in the Indian state of Andhra Pradesh, serves Kavali in SPSR Nellore Dist. It is administered under Vijayawada railway division of South Central Railway zone.

History 
The Vijayawada–Chennai link was established in 1899.

The Chirala–Elavur section was electrified in 1980–81.

Classification 
In terms of earnings and outward passengers handled, Kavali is categorized as a Non-Suburban Grade-4 (NSG-4) railway station. Based on the re–categorization of Indian Railway stations for the period of 2017–18 and 2022–23, an NSG–4 category station earns between – crore and handles  passengers.

Station amenities 

Kavali is one of the 38 stations in the division to be equipped with Automatic Ticket Vending Machines (ATVMs).

References 

Railway stations in Nellore district